The Atlas III (known as the Atlas II-AR (R for Russian) early in development ) was an American orbital launch vehicle, used in the years between 2000 and 2005. It was developed from the highly successful Atlas II rocket and shared many components. It was the first member of the Atlas family since the Atlas A to feature a "normal" staging method, compared to the previous Atlas family members, which were equipped with two jettisonable outboard engines on the first (booster) stage (with a single center engine serving as the sustainer). The Atlas III was developed further to create the Atlas V, which still flies to this day.

Description 
The Atlas III was developed from the highly successful Atlas II rocket and consisted of two stages. The first stage was heavily modified from Atlas II and the upper stage remained the Centaur, which is still in use today on the Atlas V Evolved Expendable Launch Vehicle (EELV). The Atlas III was produced in two versions. The baseline was the Atlas IIIA, but the Atlas IIIB, featuring a stretched twin-engine version of the Centaur upper stage, was also produced.

First stage 

The first stage of Atlas III was derived from that of Atlas II. Its propellant tanks were  longer than those on Atlas II, making more propellant available to the engine and increasing the vehicle's performance. Over 183 tons of RP-1 and liquid oxygen propellants were stored inside the tanks. The storied "stage-and-a-half" system used on all Atlas rockets from Atlas B to Atlas II, where three engines are lit on the ground and two of them are dropped away during flight, was replaced by a single Russian RD-180 engine, boasting higher thrust and efficiency than previous engines. Unlike Atlas II and the later Atlas V, there was no option for solid rocket motors to be added to the first stage. 12 retrorockets were mounted on the stage to aid in separating it from Centaur during flight.

The first stage continued to make use of the balloon tank technology of previous Atlas rockets, where the stainless steel tank walls were thin and had to remain pressurized in order to not collapse. The tanks were pressurized with helium gas, which was stored in 13 bottles throughout the stage.

The first stage was unchanged between the Atlas IIIA and IIIB variants.

The Atlas Roll Control Module, which contained several hydrazine thrusters and helped maintain roll stability on Atlas II, was removed on the Atlas III. The dual-chamber RD-180 was therefore responsible for gimballing to control the rocket's pitch, yaw, and roll during first-stage flight.

Centaur second stage 

The second stage of Atlas III was the Centaur. It was powered by one or two Pratt & Whitney (later Aerojet Rocketdyne) RL-10 engines, fueled by liquid hydrogen and liquid oxygen. Compared to the Atlas II, the added thrust and efficiency of the first stage of Atlas III allowed for one RL-10 engine to be removed from Centaur, and Atlas III was the first Atlas to offer a single-engine Centaur. The engines of a dual-engine Centaur were mounted directly on the aft propellant tank bulkhead, whereas the engine on a single-engine Centaur was mounted on a specially-made beam connected to those existing dual-engine mounts. The single-engine Centaur featured an RL-10A-4-1 engine with a  extendible nozzle, which increased the engine's thrust by 1.4 kN and specific impulse by 6.5 seconds.

Centaur hosted the vehicle's avionics and flight computers and controlled the entire flight. The RL-10 engine on the single-engine Centaur featured electromechanical gimballing, as opposed to the hydraulic gimballing on other variants.

The tanks of Centaur were balloon tanks like the first stage, made from stainless steel. PVC foam insulation was installed on the outside of the tank walls to help limit propellant boiloff inside the tanks.

Two variants of Centaur flew on Atlas III:

Centaur II, which flew on Atlas IIIA, was only offered with one RL-10 engine. This stage is nearly identical to the Centaur II of Atlas II, with the only major difference being only one engine attached.
Centaur III, aka Common Centaur, which flew on Atlas IIIB, was available with one or two RL-10 engines. Its tanks were  longer than those of the Centaur II, offering a substantial increase in propellant capacity and increasing the stage's performance. This stage would later fly on the Atlas V.

Flying a mission on an Atlas IIIB with a dual-engine Centaur provided a nearly 400 kg boost in payload capability to geostationary transfer orbit compared to using a single-engine Centaur.

An Extended Mission Kit (EMK) was available for Centaur. This kit included additional helium bottles, radiation shielding on the LOX tank and electronics, and thermal paint to maintain stable temperatures for electronics.

Payload fairing  
Two aluminum fairing models (which previously flew on the Atlas II) were available for the Atlas III, both with a  diameter:

Fairing selection had a small but noticeable impact on the performance of Atlas III. For example, when going to a  low Earth orbit, flying with the Extended payload fairing would reduce the payload capacity by around  compared to flying with the Large payload fairing.

Both fairing options were still flown on the Atlas V rocket until 2022. For the Atlas V, these fairings were part of the 400-series of that rocket, and a further extended option ("Extra Extended") was available.

Launches 
The first flight of the Atlas III occurred on 24 May 2000, launching the Eutelsat W4 communications satellite into a geosynchronous orbit. All Atlas III launches were made from Space Launch Complex 36B at Cape Canaveral Space Force Station (CCSFS), which at that time was called Cape Canaveral Air Force Station (CCAFS). The Atlas III made its sixth and final flight on 3 February 2005, with a classified payload for the United States National Reconnaissance Office. Although its career was short, Atlas III performed 6 successful missions with no failures.

GX 

The GX rocket, formerly under development by Galaxy Express Corporation, was originally intended to use the boost stage of the Atlas III, provided by Lockheed-Martin, and a newly designed upper stage. It would have launched from the Tanegashima Space Center, south of Kyūshū, Japan. In December 2009, the Japanese government decided to cancel the GX project.

See also 

 Comparison of orbital launchers families
 Atlas II
 Atlas V

References 

Atlas (rocket family)
Lockheed Martin space launch vehicles